Susan Oliver Estes is an American politician and former educator serving as a member of the Kansas House of Representatives from the 87th district. Elected in 2020, she assumed office on January 11, 2021.

Education 
Estes earned a Master of Education in teacher leadership and urban education from the Kansas City, Missouri, campus of Park University.

Career 
Prior to entering politics, Estes worked as a teacher. She was also the president of the Wichita Public Library Board and co-chair of the Metropolitan Area Planning Committee. Estes was elected to the Kansas House of Representatives in 2020, succeeding Renee Erickson.

Committee Assignments
Appropriations
Education
K-12 Education Budget

Personal life 
Estes is the wife of U.S. Congressman Ron Estes. They have three children and live in Wichita, Kansas.

References 

Living people
Politics of Kansas
Women state legislators in Kansas
People from Wichita, Kansas
Politicians from Wichita, Kansas
Republican Party members of the Kansas House of Representatives
Educators from Kansas
Spouses of Kansas politicians
Park University alumni
Year of birth missing (living people)
21st-century American women politicians
21st-century American politicians